Super Kudumbam is a 2001 Indian Tamil-language comedy film directed by R. K. Kalaimani, starring Prabhu, Roja, Alex, Pratyusha, Vinu Chakravarthy, and Vivek. The music is composed by Adithyan.

Plot 
Arun (Prabhu) and Hari (Vivek) are close friends and bank employees. Abhirami (Prathyusha) sincerely and secretly loves Arun been living in the opposite mansion of Arun for a long time. She always communicates with him through phone and monitors each and every day life of Arun with love. One fine day after much request from Arun she accepts to meet him finally to reciprocate her love for him. Shanthi (Roja) who is a pickpocketeer steals Abhirami's scooter and accidentally comes across Arun. Arun thinking she is Abhirami even helps her financially when conned unknowingly. That night Abhirami calls him to apologise for not able to come for the meet due to her scooter got stolen. Arun insults her for lying and blames her for conning him to give money. Deeply saddened and heartbroken Abhirami come to Arun's mansion and reveals herself. Shocked to see the real Abhirami he tries to apologize and also to convince her how sorry he feels but she tearfully goes away. Now Hari falls in love with a tomboyish retired military major's daughter Sowmiya who got impressed by his normal open minded nature. To get a rent house in that Military Major's Mansion Hari makes Arun and Shanthi act as husband and wife and also to impress the father of Hari's lover, who supports inter-caste marriage. After Sowmiya's father proposes marriage between Hari and his daughter when tricked they arrange a grand engagement at Major's Mansion. After accidentally get drunk in the party thinking it is Abirami Arun rapes Shanthi. Due to this she becomes pregnant and it is revealed during the marriage of Hari. Shanthi's uncle who is a rogue and also a womaniser wants to have sex with her before she attempts suicide which she angrily rejects. When Arun comes to convince Shanthi to get married with him. Her uncle brutally attacks him but Arun thrashes them once and for all. Shanthi attempts suicide by firing herself but Arun saves her in time. They both reconcile, he accepts Shanthi along with her sister's children whom she foster cares. Abhirami is happy to see them united.

Cast
Prabhu as Arun
Vivek as Hari
Prathyusha as Abhirami
Roja as Shanthi
Parimala as Soumya
Vinu Chakravarthy as Major Malaisamy
Pandu as Major's secretary
Alex
 Gowthami Vembunathan

Soundtrack
Music by Adhityan. Vivek wrote the lyrics for "Millenium Figuregalae".

Releases 
Malini Mannath of Chennai Online opined that "With a bad script, there is nothing much the two heroines can do to lift it up".

References

2001 films
2001 comedy films
Indian comedy films
2000s Tamil-language films
Films directed by R. K. Kalaimani